Delores Marie Wells (October 17, 1937 – February 9, 2016) was an American model and actress.  She was Playboy magazine's Playmate of the Month for its June 1960 issue and was one the cover models in January 1961.

Early life 
Wells was from Reading, Pennsylvania, and grew up with an interest in science fiction and becoming a movie star.

Career
According to The Playmate Book, Wells was paid $500 for her Playmate pictorial, along with $100 a month during her two-year exclusivity contract with Playboy. She was Playmate of the Month for June 1960. Wells was working as a dancer in the chorus of Chicago nightclub Chez Paree when she was scouted for Playboy.

Wells had a short acting career in the 1960s, episodically appearing in small parts in B-movies and television series. She preferred comedic roles and aspired to be like Lucille Ball, appearing in three of the 'beach party' movies. More steadily she was a Playboy Bunny at the Chicago Playboy Club, where she made $1000 a week. After her career at Playboy she worked as a makeup artist for Alice Cooper and in the business office of the Oakland Raiders. She worked briefly as secretary to Linda Lovelace.

Wells died in Phoenix, Arizona, at the age of 78.

Filmography
 87th Precinct - "My Friend, My Enemy" (1961) .... Clerk
 The Bob Cummings Show - "Roamin' Holiday" (1961)
 Thriller - "'Til Death Do Us Part" (1962) .... Flo
 Beach Party (1963) .... Sue
 Burke's Law - "Who Killed Alex Debbs?" (1963) .... Dream Girl
 The Time Travelers (1964) .... Reena (Danny's love interest)
 Bikini Beach (1964) .... Sniffles
 Muscle Beach Party (1964) .... Sniffles
 Banning (1967) .... Girl at Pool
 A Guide for the Married Man (1967) .... Very Attractive Woman

See also
 List of people in Playboy 1960–1969

References

External links
 
 

1937 births
2016 deaths
Actors from Reading, Pennsylvania
1960s Playboy Playmates